George Toone (6 September 1893 – 1950) was an English footballer who played in the Football League for Notts County, Sheffield Wednesday and Watford. His father, also called George played professional footballer with Notts County and England.

References

1893 births
1950 deaths
English footballers
Association football midfielders
English Football League players
Notts County F.C. players
Mansfield Town F.C. players
Watford F.C. players
Sheffield Wednesday F.C. players
Ilkeston United F.C. players